DHPR may refer to:

 6,7-dihydropteridine reductase, an enzyme
dihydropyridine receptor, a calcium channel